The Sony Xperia Go, also known as ST27i, is a mid-range smartphone developed by Sony. The Xperia Go is IP67-certified, enabling water-resistance and dust-resistance (up to 1 meter for 30 minutes). It has a 3.5-inch HVGA capacitive display with multi-touch support and Sony Mobile Bravia engine. The phone is equipped with a 5 megapixel rear-facing camera capable of shooting up to HD videos and capturing high-resolution stills with autofocus and LED flash. The Xperia Go is powered by a ST-Ericsson NovaThor U8500 SoC with 1 GHz dual core CPU and Mali-400 MP1 GPU.  It has 8 GB of internal storage (4 GB system-reserved + 4 GB usable) that can be further expandable up to 32 GB using microSD cards.

It ships with Android 2.3 Gingerbread, preloaded with an official OTA (Over The Air) upgrade to Android 4.0. It received Android 4.1.2 Jelly Bean on 24 April 2013 after a 1 month delay by Sony.

The Sony Xperia Go has limited amount RAM available for running applications, so the system frequently needs to swap out data to disk.

References 

Android (operating system) devices
Go
Mobile phones introduced in 2012